Tim Peters may refer to:

 Tim A. Peters, American humanitarian aid worker in South Korea
 Tim Peters (software engineer), American software developer
 Tim Peters (political scientist) (born 1973), German political scientist and lawyer

See also
 Timothy Peters (born 1980), American stock car racing driver